Terminalia eddowesii is a species of plant in the Combretaceae family. It is endemic to the Central Province of Papua New Guinea, on the island of New Guinea. It is threatened by habitat loss.

References

eddowesii
Endemic flora of Papua New Guinea
Trees of Papua New Guinea
Central Province (Papua New Guinea)
Taxonomy articles created by Polbot